Deewana Mastana is a 1997 Indian Hindi-language romantic comedy film directed by David Dhawan. The film stars Govinda, Anil Kapoor, and Juhi Chawla in pivotal roles. Johnny Lever, Anupam Kher, Reema Lagoo, Shakti Kapoor, Saeed Jaffrey, and Kader Khan have supporting roles, while Salman Khan makes a special appearance. This film was dedicated to Manmohan Desai.  This film borrows some elements from the 1991 Hollywood comedy, What About Bob?. Johnny Lever received the Filmfare award for Best Comedian for his performance on this film. The film was a success upon its release.

The film is also noted for bringing together two superstars Salman Khan and Juhi Chawla together in a scene, the only time they were paired together. The film also reunites Anil Kapoor and Govinda after Awaargi (1990). All four actors also appeared in Salaam-E-Ishq in 2007. The film was remade in Telugu Nuvva Nena in 2012.

Plot
Raja (Anil Kapoor) is a small-time crook who sells railway tickets on the black market at Amirpur Station. Tired of his job he looks for new ways to make a quick buck. One day, along with his friend Ghafoor (Johnny Lever) and a police inspector (Avtar Gill), he robs Rs 2.5 million from the railway treasury. Later, Raja and Gafoor bump off the inspector and run away with the loot to Mumbai.

At the Mumbai airport, Raja spots Neha Sharma (Juhi Chawla) and falls in love at first sight with her. Incidentally they land up at the same hotel where Raja and Gafoor find out that she is a psychiatrist. Raja assumes the name Raj Kumar and tries to befriend her by lying that he has just returned from America and that his driver Gafoor is suffering from a mental disorder where he regards any beautiful girl as his bhabhi. However, Gafoor cautions Raja not to hurry and be patient in matters of love.

The trouble begins when Bunnu (Govinda), the son of a wealthy businessman (Anupam Kher), is sent to Neha for treatment. He has multiple phobias and is terrified of fire, heights, running, and water and is coached by Neha to deal with his issues using "Baby steps" (modeled on Bill Murray's character in the Hollywood movie What About Bob?). Soon, he too falls for Neha and discovers he has a rival in Raja. Neha has to leave for Ooty with her father (Saeed Jaffrey) to attend her uncle's (Shakti Kapoor) wedding. She does not leave behind a forwarding address. Both Raja and Bunnu impersonate policemen and intimidate her secretary into revealing where she is. Neha is thrilled to see them in Ooty, but is drawn closer to the ill Bunnu rather than Raja.

Things take an ugly turn when Gafoor tries to kill Bunnu, who escapes. Bunnu contacts a contract killer Pappu Pager (Satish Kaushik) to bump off Raja. However, that plan fails. Armed with a gold ring and garland, Neha calls Bunnu and Raja to court, ostensibly with the purpose of marriage. Both are surprised to see the other there. Eventually they find out that Neha is actually marrying Prem (Salman Khan, in a guest appearance) and Raja and Bunnu end up being witnesses to her marriage. Raveena Tandon makes a special appearance in the end as both Raj and Bunnu walk off together.

Cast
Anil Kapoor as Raj Kumar / Raja Inspector Bansi Rao
Govinda as Bunnu
Juhi Chawla as Dr. Neha Sharma
Johnny Lever as Gafoor Ali, Raja's friend
Anupam Kher as Brijbhan "Birju" Rastogi, Bunnu's father
Reema Lagoo as Subhadra Rastogi, Bunnu's mother
Saeed Jaffrey as Nandkishore Kapoor, Neha's father
Upasna Singh as Archana Kapoor, Neha's paternal aunt
Himani Shivpuri as Latika Sharma, Raja's mother
Avtar Gill as Inspector Dharmesh Mhatre
Shiva Rindani as Goon in Pub
Guddi Maruti as Suzie 
Shashi Kiran as Bus Driver 
Pratibha Sinha as Tina 
Satish Kaushik as Pappu Pager 
Shakti Kapoor as Somendar Kapoor, Neha's paternal uncle
Kader Khan as Marriage Registrar
Salman Khan as Prem Kumar (cameo appearance)
Raveena Tandon in a cameo appearance
David Dhawan as himself 
Salim Khan as man blasting the liquor stills (uncredited) 
Ram P. Sethi as man asking for discount for train tickets (uncredited) 
Babbanlal Yadav as House servant (uncredited)

Soundtrack
The songs became a huge hit upon release. 
Songs like 'Tere Bina Dil Lagta Nahin', 'Head ya tail', 'O Mummy Mummy', and 'Hungama Ho Gaya' had become very popular.

Reception 
Syed Firdas Ashraf of Redif  opined that "Overall, the film is no different from the earlier masala mixtures ground together by David Dhawan and Govinda".

Award
 Filmfare Best Comedian - Johnny Lever
 Filmfare Award Nomination for Best Actor - Govinda

References

External links

Planet Bollywood review

1990s Hindi-language films
1997 films
Films scored by Laxmikant–Pyarelal
Films directed by David Dhawan
1997 romantic comedy films
Hindi films remade in other languages
Indian romantic comedy films